John Evans House, also known as Big Spring Farm, is located in Martinsburg, West Virginia.  It was listed on the National Register of Historic Places in 2006.

References

Houses completed in 1756
Houses in Berkeley County, West Virginia
Houses on the National Register of Historic Places in West Virginia
I-house architecture in West Virginia
Buildings and structures in Martinsburg, West Virginia
National Register of Historic Places in Martinsburg, West Virginia